James or Jim Carrigan may refer to:

 Jim Carrigan (judge) (1929–2014), United States federal judge
 James J. Carrigan (born 1941), American attorney and politician

See also
James Corrigan (disambiguation)